Hunejan (also Romanized as Hūnejān and Hunjān; also known as Hinijān) is a village in Esfarjan Rural District, in the Central District of Shahreza County, Isfahan Province, Iran. At the 2006 census, its population was 2,794, in 770 families.

References 

Populated places in Shahreza County